Wimbledon Stadium, also known as Wimbledon Greyhound Stadium, was a greyhound racing track located in Wimbledon in southwest London, England.

It also hosted stock car and other small circuit motor racing events, and until 2005 hosted motorcycle speedway. The stadium hosted the English Greyhound Derby every year between 1985 and 2016.

Facing declining attendances and with no renovations undertaken for many years, the stadium was put up for sale by the owners, the Greyhound Racing Association, and closed permanently in March 2017. The site was purchased by Galliard Homes Limited, in order to build 600 new apartments and a new football stadium, the new Plough Lane, for AFC Wimbledon. The stadium was demolished in 2018 to clear the site for the new development; it was one of London's last remaining greyhound stadia, leaving only Crayford and Romford remaining, and was the third to close since the year 2000 after Catford in 2003 and Walthamstow in 2008.

Stadium
The facilities originally included a brick-fronted grandstand, seating 8,000, executive suites, several bars, and catering facilities, including a large waiter-service restaurant. The stadium was surrounded by a large open-air car park, which hosted car-boot sales on Saturdays and Sundays for many years.

Greyhound racing

Origins
The greyhound stadium was constructed east of the River Wandle on a section of marshland which was difficult to build on and was prone to flooding. The only buildings nearby were a chamois leather mill, a large sewage works, and the Plough public house. Slightly to the east was Summerstown Road, which held the only housing in the immediate area.

The difficult plot did not deter South London Greyhound Racecourses Ltd., who went ahead with plans to build a large stadium ready for 1928. However, financial difficulties halted the project until a consortium headed by Bill 'WJ' Cearns, whose firm had been responsible for the construction of the stadium, stepped in with sufficient funds to save the project.

Opening 
The first race on opening night, 19 May 1928, was won by a greyhound named Ballindura trained by Harry Leader. The Burhill kennels in Walton-on-Thames became renowned within the industry for housing the hounds for Wimbledon, and were used by trainers Stan Biss, Harry Leader and Ken Appleton. Paddy McEllistrim, a Norfolk farmer and breeder of greyhounds, and Sidney Orton, joined the training kennels soon after.

1928–1939
Wimbledon was the first track to introduce weighing scales in 1929 at their kennels, so that the racing public could be issued with the greyhounds' weights before racing. The same year, Harry Leader returned to Ireland and was replaced by Sidney Orton. New events named the Puppy Derby, International, Wimbledon Gold Cup and Wimbledon Spring Stakes were all inaugurated.

In December 1929 Arundel Kempton purchased Mick the Miller for £2,000 as a present for his wife, and placed him with Sidney Orton. The track had already been associated with Mick the Miller because the champion took up residence at the kennels of Paddy McEllistrim during the duration of the 1929 English Greyhound Derby. Con Stevens was the first Racing Manager and was instrumental in bringing the first classic race to Wimbledon in the form of the Laurels in 1930. Mick the Miller claimed his second Derby crown in 1930, propelling himself, the sport, and Wimbledon into national fame.

Trainer Joe Harmon arrived from White City in 1934, and Paddy Fortune, another new trainer at Wimbledon, claimed a second Derby victory for the track in 1939, with greyhound Highland Rum. The 'Two Year Old Produce Stakes' was introduced in 1935, and another event named 'The Key' began in 1936.

1940s
During World War II the stadium suffered bomb damage but continued to operate. The well-known Irish dog Tanist was put with Paddy McEllistrim, but found it hard to cope with the sharp turns at Wimbledon, and failed to win a single race by the end of June 1940. By contrast, Ballynennan Moon became a household name during the war years after becoming a Wimbledon greyhound, with Billy Quinn negotiating the sale to Mrs Cearns, wife of the managing director of Wimbledon Stadium. In 1942, after a winter rest, he won the Walthamstow Stakes and Wimbledon Spring Cup, before embarking on forty wins and seven second places from 48 starts. After finishing first fourteen times in succession, he was beaten by a neck by Laughing Lackey, narrowly failing to beat Mick the Miller's 19 straight wins record.

A new puppy named Ballyhennessy Seal first came to the scene in 1943 after moving from Catford Stadium to Wimbledon, and was placed in the care of Stan Martin. Martin had joined the Wimbledon training ranks following the death of Joe Harmon in 1942. Martin guided Ballyhennessy Seal to a third Derby success for the track in 1945.

1950s
After the war the Wimbledon management constructed a new grandstand in place of the war damaged section of the stadium. They also introduced new perforated tote tickets following continual losses on forged tote tickets every Saturday to the tune of £1,000. Ballymac Ball was the next greyhound to win the Derby for Wimbledon, the brindle dog winning the 1950 event for Stan Martin. In 1950 the Instaprint photo timer was tested at Wimbledon, and given the seal of approval to use throughout Britain.

Con Stevens continued to manage the stadium throughout the 1950s, overseeing the success of the track. A fifth Derby success came in 1957, after the Dennis Hannafin (brother of Jerry) trained Ford Spartan took the title. In 1958 Paddy Fortune died, and his kennels were taken over by George Waterman. Within a few months, Sidney Orton retired and his son Clare Orton took up his position at Wimbledon, with Clare having been a trainer in his own right for nearly ten years.

1960s
Phil Rees Sr. joined the track as a trainer in the 1960s following the retirement of Dennis Hannafin, and the Greyhound Express Merit Puppy Championship was renamed the Juvenile in 1963. George Waterman died, and his Burhill kennel range was given to new trainer Nora Gleeson. The three-time Derby winning trainer Paddy McEvoy also joined the track in the late 1960s. Towards the end of 1969, the possibility of the stadium being redeveloped became a possibility, but the Greyhound Racing Association bought a major stake in Wimbledon after a prolonged battle against developers.

1970s
Murmurings about redevelopment remained as GRA Property Trust continued to buy and sell stadiums, but the GRA chose to invest in the stadium, raising the winning prize money levels of the Laurels to £2,000 in 1970 and £5,000 one year later. In 1972, the GRA sealed a deal to buy Wimbledon Stadium outright, and bring the track fully under the GRA banner. Paddy McEllistrim and Stan Martin both retired in 1974, and were replaced by Paddy's daughter Norah, and by Sam Sykes, a former head lad to Clare Orton. Con Stevens resigned from the board of directors at Wimbledon, bringing to an end his 46 years of association with the track.

Wimbledon introduced new technology in 1976 after using a sectional timing mechanism, and were one of the first tracks to use the system of grading (selecting greyhounds in classes on ability). In the same year, Mutts Silver, trained by Phil Rees Snr., won the Derby; Rees handed his kennels to his son Philip Rees Jnr. just two years later after retiring.

1980s
Wimbledon was chosen to host the sport's premier event, the 1985 Greyhound Derby, following the closure of White City in 1984. Industry support for Wembley to be given the premier race was inconsequential, since GRA owned the rights to the competition and would not allow a non-GRA track to have the race. Bob Rowe, Chief Racing Manager for the GRA, was Racing Manager at Wimbledon when the track was handed the Derby, and trainers Tom Foster and David Kinchett both joined from White City. Pagan Swallow won the competition, and the Rees family became the second father and son to each win the Derby. Arthur Hitch joined the tack in 1987 when Slough Stadium closed, and following the closure of Harringay Stadium the prestigious Oaks for bitches was relocated to Wimbledon.

1990s
In 1990 a greyhound called Druids Johno was given to Prince Edward; the half share of the black dog had been given to the Prince by Patsy Byrne during a charity meeting at Kingsmead Stadium, Canterbury. Byrne joined Wimbledon as a trainer in 1991, and sponsored the long-running International in the process. This appointment brought about the last Derby triumph for the track, with Ballinderry Ash taking the 1991 title to bring the total to eight, just one behind Wembley.

In 1992 GRA parent company Wembley PLC announced losses of £8 million, despite a £13 million profit in its UK operation. Simon Harris arrived from Hall Green to become Racing Manager, with Bob Rowe remaining at Wimbledon in his role as Chief Racing Manager of the GRA. 1996 saw the introduction of the Intertrack betting service, which enabled race-goers at other tracks around the country to view racing and place bets directly into the Wimbledon tote. In 1998 the Laurels relocated to sister track Belle Vue Stadium, and a new Paddock Bar extension costing £500,000 opened; the kennels were moved to the first bend to facilitate the change. The next year, Sky Sports screened their first greyhound meeting at Wimbledon, which included the Springbok final. The GRA switched the Grand National to Wimbledon from Hall Green in 1999.

2000–2017
Rapid Ranger completed two Derby successes in 2001, emulating Mick the Miller and Patricias Hope. Seamus Cahill and Bernie Doyle joined Wimbledon from Catford and Reading Stadium respectively in 2002. Catford closed in 2003, resulting in three new trainers, John Simpson, Tony Taylor and John Walsh. Catford Racing Manager Derek Hope took over from the departing Simon Harris, who left for Coventry. In 2003 Wimbledon underwent £70,000 in track improvements, following criticism received during the 2002 Derby. Trainer Tommy Foster retired in 2004.

Westmead Hawk won the 2005 and 2006 Greyhound Derby, becoming the fourth greyhound to attain two wins. Trainer Ray Peacock died in 2007, with racing Manager Derek Hope leaving to join William Hill, being replaced by Gary Matthews. In 2008 Richard Rees, son of Philip Rees Jnr., became a third-generation trainer at Wimbledon; Philip Rees Jnr retired due to ill health. Tony Morris, who stood as a track bookmaker, also retired after a long career at Wimbledon.  In 2010 Wimbledon underwent major changes in time for the Derby; the grandstand was switched to the far side of the stadium, and the physical makeup of the track was altered, meaning new track records would be set. The changes cost around £400,000, which were partly funded by a £195,370 grant from the British Greyhound Racing Fund.

The GRA allowed the Grand National to go to Central Park Stadium in Sittingbourne in 2012, and leading trainer Norah McEllistrim left for Brighton & Hove Greyhound Stadium. Bob Rowe switched to Belle Vue as the Racing Manager, along with the Oaks.

After sharply falling attendances for many years, and with the stadium becoming dilapidated, its closure was announced by the GRA and the final meeting was held on 25 March 2017. This attracted a large crowd, many of whom were turned away due to reduced capacity restrictions, caused by much of the stadium being closed off for public safety. The last ever race was won by Glitzy King, trained by Brian Nicholls, who provided many of the dogs in the final few months of the stadium's existence.

Speedway

Until 2005, the stadium was also home for over 50 years to the now defunct Wimbledon Dons speedway team. It was famous for hosting the Internationale meeting every season from 1962 until 1981, also hosting a qualifying round of this competition in 1961.

Speedway arrived at Wimbledon in the 1928 pioneer season, and a team was entered in the league competitions from 1929 to 1939. The team was re-formed after the war and the Dons raced in the top flight National League Division One from 1946 to 1964. The Dons were multiple winners of the league in the 1950s, and were founding members of the British League in 1965. From 1946, reopening after the war, average weekly attendances were in excess of 30,000, until the early 1950s, when the sport declined rapidly in popularity. However, Wimbledon remained one of the top teams, with healthy crowd figures, and upon the closure of Wembley in 1956 were the only team in London (excluding sporadic appearances by New Cross in 1959/1960 and 1963) until 1963 when Hackney entered the Provincial League, and 1964 when West Ham reopened in the National League (now known as the 1st Division Elite League).

Wimbledon's tenure in the top flight came to an end in the 1980s and the Greyhound Racing Association, the owners of the stadium at the time, decreed that speedway would end at the end of the 1986 season. However, David Pickles, a London stockbroker, gathered together a consortium in the 1986/87 close season that ensured that the Dons would continue to run. They employed the ex-England team manager John Berry, and enjoyed reasonable success on and off the track in their first season. After a disagreement with Berry and the other members of the board, Pickles dramatically resigned as chairman of the club during the match with Exeter in September 1987, selling his shares back to the other members. With a few reshuffles at board level and the leaving of Berry, the remaining members eventually took Wimbledon back to the British League Division One in 1991, but the move proved disastrous and with only a couple of months of the season having been ridden, the financial losses proved to be so great that they were forced to disband the team. In June 1991 Wimbledon rode their final meeting, which was eventually curtailed due to the weather. Although there was no longer any league racing at the Plough Lane stadium, the team continued their league fixtures for the 1991 season, moving to Eastbourne, and were known during this period as the Eastbourne Dons.

Having been defunct for eleven years, the team were then reopened again at Wimbledon Stadium in 2002, but were finally disbanded completely in 2005 as a result of a dispute between the team's promoters and the owners of the stadium, over a proposed large rent increase.

Stock car racing

Plough Lane also hosted Motor Racing events promoted by Spedeworth International, including Superstox, Stock Cars, Hot Rods and Bangers. The first stock car meeting at Wimbledon was on 29 September 1962 (the Superstox World Championship), and the circuit quickly became Spedeworth's flagship venue, with the World Final being held there every year up to and including 1974. The World Championship, along with other key race meetings such as Carnival Night, became very popular and were often 'ticket only' events filled to capacity. The stadium also boasted its own stock car racing teams in 1966 (London Sparrows) and 1971-72 (Canaries/Dons). The 1966 team shared its base with New Cross Stadium. The Unlimited Banger World Final also used to take place at Wimbledon until the event moved to Foxhall Stadium in 2008, citing the introduction of the London low emission zone as making it too expensive for the transporters to travel to the venue.

Other notable events
Wimbledon Stadium was the scene for part of the music video for the 1978 Queen song "Bicycle Race", in which 65 professional female models rode on bicycles (nude/partially-clothed) around the stadium.

Banger racing at the stadium was featured in episode 12, series 1 of the 1970s ITV police series The Sweeney, named "Contact Breaker".

Closure and demolition 

In 2007 the stadium was purchased by development company Galliard Homes, when the Greyhound Racing Association was put up for sale (along with all of its assets) by parent company Wembley PLC. Following this, local professional football team AFC Wimbledon expressed interest in building their new football stadium on the site of the greyhound track. A joint planning application made by Galliard Homes and AFC Wimbledon to build the new football stadium, together with 600 residences, on the site of the greyhound stadium was approved by the London Borough of Merton in December 2015 despite the plans being in contravention of the "London Plan". Attempts to prevent the closure of the stadium failed; a £20 million rival planning bid to build a new greyhound stadium, submitted by Irish businessman Paschal Taggart, owner of Shelbourne Park Greyhound Stadium, and a bid by pressure group 'Save Wimbledon Stadium Action Group' to have the stadium granted listed status by Historic England both came to nothing. The stadium finally closed to the public on 25 March 2017, and demolition of the stadium and associated buildings commenced on 16 March 2018.

Competitions
Wimbledon hosted the following competitions throughout its history.

The Derby

St Leger

Grand National

Laurels

Oaks

Puppy Derby

Juvenile

Champion Hurdle

Cearns Invitation

Champion Stakes

Derby Consolation/Invitation

The International

The Key

The Key was a competition held from 1936 over the stayers distance and then the marathon distance.

1936 -1957 (725 yards), 1936 -1975 (940 yards), 1975-1994 (868 metres)

Wimbledon Gold Cup

The Wimbledon Gold Cup was a competition held from 1929 originally over hurdles and later the stayers distance.

1936 -1975 (500 yards hurdles), 1975-1982 (460 metres hurdles), 1986-1994 (660 metres)

Wimbledon Spring Cup

The Wimbledon Spring Cup also known as the Spring Stakes was a competition held from 1929 the standard distance and later the stayers distance.

1929 -1959 (500 yards), 1936 -1975 (700 yards), 1975-1994 (660 metres)

Two-Year Old Produce Stakes

The Wimbledon Two-Year Old Produce Stakes was a competition held from 1935 until 1974.
In 1974 the track announced that the race would end blaming changing ties and increased expenses.

1935 -1974 (500 yards)

Track records

Post Metric records

Pre Metric records

References

External links
Spedeworth International (car racing promoters)

Defunct greyhound racing venues in the United Kingdom
Defunct greyhound racing venues in London
Defunct sports venues in London
Stock car racing venues
Defunct speedway venues in England
Buildings and structures in Wimbledon, London
Tourist attractions in the London Borough of Merton
Sport in the London Borough of Merton
Sports venues completed in 1928
1928 establishments in England
Sports venues demolished in 2018
2017 disestablishments in England
Greyhound racing in London
Demolished sports venues in the United Kingdom